The following are current and past operators of the Fokker F27:

Civil operators
As of August 2022, less than 20 Fokker F27 aircraft (Cargo and military variants only) remained in airline and military service around the world. Few airlines operate numbers of the type as they are used only for cargo and military operations. Former Fokker F27, Fairchild F-27 and Fairchild FH-227 operators are listed as well.

Air Algérie

TAAG Angola Airlines

CATA Línea Aérea
LADE

Airlines of New South Wales
Ansett Airlines
Associated Airlines of Australia
Department of Civil Aviation
East-West Airlines
Aircruising Australia
Australia Post
Trans Australia Airlines (TAA)

Amerer Air

Gulf Aviation

Biman Bangladesh Airlines

SABENA
Flanders Airlines
Delta Air Transport
Air Alpes
DHL
FedEx

Lloyd Aéreo Boliviano

Rio Sul Serviços Aéreos Regionais
Tavaj Linhas Aéreas
TAM Airlines
Votec Linhas Aéreas 

 Burma  (Also known as Myanmar)
Burma Airways Corporation (became Myanma Airways in 1989)
Union of Burma Airways (became Burma Airways Corporation in 1972)

Conair (converted to fire fighting air tankers)
Government of Quebec
Norcanair (Operated 1 Fairchild F-27, former Hughes Airwest aircraft)
Nordair (Operated 1 Fairchild Hiller FH-227)
Quebecair
Time Air
WestEx Airlines

Government of Chad

Laoag

Cubana de Aviación

ABA Air

Air Congo
Air Tropiques

Maersk Air
Newair Airservice
Sterling Airways

Air Sinai

Finnair

Air France
Air Inter
Institut Géographique National
Sécurité Civile

Air Polynésie

Air Max-Gabon

FTG Air Service
LTU
WDL Aviation

T.A. de la Guinee-Bissau

Aerolíneas Sosa
Atlantic Airlines de Honduras

Farnair Hungary

Icelandair

Aer Lingus
Euroceltic Airways
Iona National Airways
Starair

East-West Airlines (India)
Elbee Airlines
Indian Airlines
NEPC Airlines

Merpati Nusantara Airlines
Sempati Air
Garuda Indonesia (operated several Fokker F27 aircraft before being sold or transferred to Merpati)
AirMark Cargo
Trigana Air 
Kalstar Aviation (operated several Fokker F27 aircraft leased from Trigana Air)
Asialink Cargo Airlines

Iran Aseman Airlines
Iranian government
National Iranian Oil Company (NIOC)

Alisarda
ATI - Aero Trasporti Italiani
MiniLiner

Air Ivoire

All Nippon Airways

Royal Jordanian

East African Airways

Kenya Airways

Air Baltic

Lesotho Airways

Libyan Arab Airlines
Libyan Red Crescent

Luxair

Malaysia Airline System
Malaysia-Singapore Airlines

Aerocaribe
  Air One (Mexico (used only for cargo)
CityFlyer

Royal Air Maroc

DETA Air

 (Also known as Burma)

Myanma Airways

F27 Friendship Association
The Dutch Royal Flight
NLM Cityhopper

Air ALM

Air New Zealand
Airwork (New Zealand)
New Zealand Ministry of Transport (operated for Navaids calibration flights)
NZNAC

Aeronica

Afrijet
Nigeria Airways

Air Executive Norway
Braathens SAFE
Busy Bee
Stellar Airfreighter

Oman Air

Pakistan International Airlines

Air Panama

Air Niugini

Aero Condor
Expreso Aéreo

Air Manila
Laoag International Airlines
Mactan
Philippine Airlines

Expresso Aéreo

Oceanair

Somali Airlines

Comair (South Africa)

Korean Air Lines

Aviaco
Iberia Airlines
Seven Air
Spantax
Transeuropa

Mihin Air

Air West Express
Sudan Airways

Balair

Air Tanzania

THY Türk Hava Yolları

Uganda Airways

Falcon Express Cargo Airlines

Air Anglia
Air UK
British Midland
Channel Express
Jersey European Airways
Manx Airlines

Fairchild F-27 and Fairchild Hiller FH-227 aircraft are included in this list of U.S. operators as well.
 Air North (subsequent name change to Brockway Air.  Aircraft were ex-Swift Aire Lines)
 Air Oregon
 AirPac (Operated a single Fairchild Hiller FH-227B aircraft.  Alaska-based air carrier.)
 Air West 
 Air Wisconsin
Allegheny Airlines (Operated several Fairchild F-27 aircraft before rebranding as USAir in 1979.  Suburban Airlines separately operated Fokker F27 aircraft as Allegheny Commuter via a code sharing feeder agreement with Allegheny Airlines)
Aloha Airlines (Fairchild F-27 aircraft)
Amerer Air
 Aspen Airways (Fairchild F-27 aircraft)
Bonanza Air Lines (Fairchild F-27 aircraft)
 Britt Airways (Fairchild F-27 and Fairchild Hiller FH-227 aircraft)
 Business Express (ex-Pilgrim Airlines aircraft)
Chicago Air
 ConnectAir (Fairchild F-27 aircraft)
Delta Air Lines (Fairchild Hiller FH-227, ex-Northeast Airlines aircraft)
Emerald Air (Fairchild Hiller FH-227 aircraft)
Empire Airways (Fairchild F-27 aircraft)
FedEx
Hawkins and Powers Aviation, Inc
Horizon Air (Fairchild F-27 aircraft)
Hughes Airwest 
Mesaba Airlines
Midstate Airlines (Fokker F27 and Fairchild Hiller FH-227 aircraft)
Mississippi Valley Airlines
Mountain Air Cargo
Northeast Airlines (Fairchild Hiller FH-227 aircraft)
Northern Consolidated Airlines (Fairchild F-27 aircraft.  Acquired by Wien Air Alaska)
Oceanair (Fairchild F-27 aircraft)
Ozark Airlines (Fairchild F-27 and Fairchild Hiller FH-227 aircraft)
Pacific Air Lines (Fairchild F-27 aircraft)
Pacific Alaska Airlines (Fairchild F-27 aircraft)
Piedmont Airlines (Fairchild Hiller FH-227 aircraft)
 Pilgrim Airlines (acquired by Business Express)
 Suburban Airlines (operated F27 aircraft as Allegheny Commuter for Allegheny Airlines)
 Swift Aire Lines (600 series models purchased new from Fokker)
 United Express (operated by Air Wisconsin via a code share feeder agreement with United Airlines)
 West Coast Airlines (Fairchild F-27 aircraft)
 Wien Air Alaska (Fairchild F-27 aircraft)

Air Zaïre
Scibe Airlift

International
//
Scandinavian Airlines System
//
East African Airways

Military operators

Algerian Air Force

Angolan Air Force - bought two F27-200s in 1978-1979, one in maritime patrol aircraft configuration.

Argentine Air Force - 1 remaining in use as of December 2015.

Bolivian Air Force - Purchased 6 F27-400M Troopships in 1980 for use on airline services by Transporte Aéreo Militar as well as normal military service. 3 remained in use in 2001.
Bolivian Army - 1 in use as of December 2015.

 (Also known as Myanmar)
Burmese Air Force (Became Myanmar Air Force) - 2 F-27 and 2 F-227 remaining in service as of December 2015.

Chad Air Force 1 F-27-600 aircraft

Cote d'Ivoire Air Force

Finnish Air Force

Guatemalan Air Force - 1 in service as of December 2015.

Imperial Iranian Air Force, later Islamic Republic of Iran Air Force - 10 in service as of December 2015.
Imperial Iranian Army, later Islamic Republic of Iran Army (Army Aviation) - 2 in service as of December 2015.
Imperial Iranian Navy, later Islamic Republic of Iran Navy (Navy Aviation) - 3 in service (2 transports and 1 maritime patrol aircraft) in December 2015.

Mexican Navy - 2 FH-227 VIP transports.

  (Also known as Burma) 
Myanmar Air Force

Pakistan Air Force
Pakistan Navy - 7 in service as of December 2015.
Pakistan Naval Air Arm
Pakistan Maritime Security Agency]

Philippine Air Force - 1 in service as of December 2015.
Philippine Navy

Royal Thai Navy - 4 in service (2 transports and two patrol aircraft) as of December 2015.

United States Army Parachute Team (former)
United States Navy

Former military operators

Royal Australian Navy

	
Benin People's Air Force - 1 received in 1978.

Biafran Air Force - 1, seized by the Biafran authorities in April 1967

Ecuadorian Air Force 

French Air Force

Ghana Air Force - Had 1 in service as of December 2015.

Icelandic Coast Guard

Indian Coast Guard

Indonesian Air Force – Retired in 2012-2015 period

Royal New Zealand Air Force

Royal Netherlands Air Force
Royal Netherlands Navy

Nigerian Air Force

North Yemen Air Force

Peruvian Navy

Spanish Air Force 

Senegalese Air Force - Had 3 in service as of December 2015.
Senegambia Air Force

Sudanese Air Force - Four ordered in 1964.

Uruguayan Air Force

Yemen Air Force

See also
Fokker F27

References 

 .

F27